The Crawford County Railroad ran from Girard to Walnut in Crawford County, Kansas, USA.  It was established on February 6, 1884, from the failed Nebraska, Topeka, Iola and Memphis Railroad.  The Crawford County Railroad lasted for nine days before being acquired by the Kansas Southern Railroad.

Predecessors of the Atchison, Topeka and Santa Fe Railway
Defunct Kansas railroads
Railway companies established in 1884
Railway companies disestablished in 1884
Crawford County, Kansas